Peru made its Paralympic Games début at the 1972 Summer Paralympics in Heidelberg, with a single representative to compete in swimming. It sent two competitors to the 1976 Summer Paralympics, then was absent for two decades, before returning in 1996 with a three-man delegation. It has participated in every subsequent edition of the Summer Paralympics, but has never taken part in the Winter Paralympics.

Peruvians have won a total of eight Paralympic medals: three gold, one silver and four bronze. The country's first medals came in 1976, when Teresa Chiappo won gold in the women's singles (category D) in table tennis, and bronze in the women's javelin (category D). J. Gonzales took bronze in the men's 100m backstroke, category 5. 

Also in swimming, Jaime Eulert won Peru's only medal of the 1996 Games: a gold in the men's 50m freestyle S3, with a world record time of 51.95s. He won another gold in the same event in 2000, breaking his own world record and setting a new one in 49.03s; to that, he added a silver medal in the 50m backstroke. He medalled again in both those events in 2004, taking two bronze. In 2008, Eulert was a non-starter in the backstroke, and was disqualified in the freestyle. No other member of Peru's three-man delegation that year won a medal, and the country thus finished the Games without a medal for the first time since 1972.

Medal tally

Medalists

See also
 Peru at the Olympics

References